Thayer Academy (TA) is a private, co-educational, college-preparatory day school located in Braintree, Massachusetts, United States. The academy, conceived in 1871 at the bequest of General Sylvanus Thayer, known as the father of the United States Military Academy at West Point, and founder of the Thayer School of Engineering at Dartmouth College, was established in 1877. Thayer annually enrolls approximately 470 students in the Upper School (grades 9–12) and an additional 220 students in the Middle School (grades 5–8). The  campus is situated in the heart of Braintree and consists of eight buildings and 54 classrooms. Students are drawn primarily from Boston's MetroWest and South Shore communities.

History
General Thayer, born in Braintree, Massachusetts, graduated as valedictorian from both Dartmouth College and the United States Military Academy at West Point, New York. General Thayer was dedicated to hard work, and at the age of 17, he taught in the local schools of Hanover, New Hampshire to earn money to pay for college – an early sign of the importance he attached to teaching and education. He was Superintendent of the Military Academy at West Point from 1817–1833. General Thayer's 1871 will provided for the creation of Thayer Academy, and on September 12, 1877, the Academy opened its doors to 30 students in what is now Main Building. Glover opened sometime later in 1894. The junior school (grades 5–8), Thayerlands, opened in 1924 and quickly grew to include eight grades as well as kindergarten and nursery school. Beginning in 1969, the lower grades were gradually eliminated, and Thayerlands became Thayer Academy Middle School. Thayer has been a co-educational institution since its founding.

Academic program, students and faculty
Thayer recently completed two state-of-the-art Collaborative Design Labs, a two-story strength and conditioning facility, a new Middle School Resource Center, and six synthetic grass playing fields. In addition, a new Center for the Arts opened its doors in the fall of 2008 and includes a 550-seat theater, dance studios, and art classrooms. Tuition is $45,850 (2016–2017). The school provides $8 million in financial aid and is easily accessible from the major surrounding highways: routes 3, I-93, and I-95, and is within walking distance of the Braintree MBTA Red Line rapid transit station.

Total combined enrollment at Thayer Upper and Middle Schools is approximately 700. The Thayer faculty consists of over 100 teachers, and the average class size is between 13 and 16 students.

100% of Thayer graduates matriculate to four-year colleges and universities. Over 90% of students taking AP exams earn scores of 3 or better.

Academic highlights

Mathletes
The math team consists of 15 students of all grade levels who meet for practice and travel to area high schools for competitions.

Voice
Thayer Academy's student magazine Voice, published three times per year.

In addition, eight Thayer students won Individual Achievement (IA) awards. Over 1,300 entries were received for various IA categories and typically, 10% or fewer entries in any category win recognition.

Voice has two faculty advisors who help students with production questions and ideas. Students are encouraged and expected to display professional journalistic standards and make decisions on their own regarding writing, editing and publishing.

The basic guideline for Voice is that no topic is off-limits. The school administration does not censor the content and all content and editorials are written by students. There is a staff of 18-20 and no single editor.

Green Projects: Grease Lightning

In 2007, with the support of faculty, parents, trustees, and local restaurants, the Advanced Placement Environmental Science (APES) class converted a 1981 Mercedes Benz 300D (diesel) to an environmentally friendly 'green car' that runs on filtered waste vegetable oil.

The class spent a semester installing the conversion kit from Greasecar. The students were divided into teams, some focusing on the build and install, others focusing on the wiring and still another group in charge of the marketing and advertising. "...when Mr. Schneider asked us all if we were interested in making a grease car, ...we thought it would be really, really fun," said Liz Tillotson, a student from Milton, Massachusetts. "We eventually decided to do something that would really stand out and make an impact in the community," said Skip Schneider, the science teacher who supervised the project.

Athletics
Thayer's athletic teams participate in the competitive Independent School League (ISL), the oldest independent school athletic association in the United States. Thayer offers these interscholastic sports at the High School varsity level:

 Fall
Boys': Intramural Crew, Soccer, Football, Cross Country, Intramural Fitness & Games (MS)
Girls': Intramural Crew, Soccer, Field Hockey, Cross Country, Volleyball, Intramural Fitness & Games (MS)
 Winter
Boys': Basketball, Ice Hockey, Swimming and Diving, Skiing, Wrestling
Girls': Basketball, Ice Hockey, Swimming and Diving, Skiing, Wrestling, Gymnastics
 Spring
Girls': Lacrosse, Crew, Track and Field, Tennis, Golf, Softball
Boys': Lacrosse, Crew, Track and Field, Tennis, Golf, Baseball

Thayer also offers interscholastic sports in the Middle School.

As a general rule, Middle School Students are required to participate in interscholastic activities or Health and Wellness (a program consisting of intramural and fitness activities), year-round. Upper School students are required to participate in 11 terms of interscholastic sports or Health and Wellness classes in order to graduate.

The Thayer Academy campus is equipped with multiple facilities that foster athletic training and performance. Located directly behind the academic buildings include turf soccer, baseball and football fields. On campus, The Sawyer Athletic center is located in Thayer's campus center and is home to the athletic department offices, Alumni Gym, Memorial Gym and the hall of fame lobby. The athletic training room is also located in the campus center in the Fish Center for Physical Fitness. Thayer's additional facilities include two off campus turf Field Hockey fields.

Notable alumni

 Jared Porter '99, baseball executive
 Tony Amonte '89, professional athlete, former NHL and Olympic athlete; member of the U.S. Hockey Hall of Fame
 John Cheever, Pulitzer Prize winning author (did not graduate) 
 Charlie Coyle, current professional hockey player for the Boston Bruins
 William D. Delahunt '59, U.S. Representative, 10th District (MA-D)
 John Curtis Gowan, psychologist
 Corey Griffin, philanthropist and co-founder of the Ice Bucket Challenge to raise funds for Amyotrophic lateral sclerosis research
 David Grossack '73, attorney
 Kelly Amonte Hiller '92, head lacrosse coach at Northwestern University
 Mike Jones '03, basketball player, University of Maryland Terrapins
 Tiffany Kelly '05, Miss Massachusetts USA 2006
 Asa S. Knowles, educator and president of Northeastern University from 1959 to 1975
 Mike Mottau '96, hockey player, Hobey Baker Award winner
 Mike Moyer '90, author
 Brooks Orpik '98, hockey player, Washington Capitals
 Jeremy Roenick '88, professional athlete, former NHL and Olympic athlete, member of the U.S. Hockey Hall of Fame
 Dave Silk '76, former professional ice hockey player
 General Gordon R. Sullivan '55, United States Army general, Chief of Staff of the Army and a member of the Joint Chiefs of Staff
 Ryan Whitney '01, hockey player, Anaheim Ducks
 Mary Parker Follett graduated 1885, social worker known as the "Mother of Modern Management"
 Frank N. Newman '59, international banking executive; served as Deputy Secretary of the U.S. Treasury Department
 Charles Martin Castleman '57, violinist and teacher
 Andrew Card '65, White House Chief of Staff 2001–2006, United States Secretary of Transportation 1992-1993
 Frederick C. Murphy '36, Medal of Honor recipient during World War II
 Bradley Birkenfeld '83, private banker, convicted felon, and whistleblower
 John W. Beal, former Massachusetts Commissioner for Public Works (dropped out)
 Asa P. French, former United States Attorney for the District of Massachusetts, served as legal counsel to the Rockefeller Family
 Ella Lyman Cabot, educator, author and lecturer
 Armand Zildjian, Armenian-American manufacturer of cymbals and the former head of the Avedis Zildjian Company
 Enrico Cappucci, politician who served as a member of the Massachusetts House of Representatives
 Adam Gaudette, '15, Hobey Baker Award winner and current professional hockey player
 Carmelo Travieso, Puerto Rican basketball player for UMass Amherst
 Austin Gallagher, American marine biologist and social entrepreneur, best known for his research on sharks and his role as founder and CEO of Beneath the Waves, a non-profit organization focusing on ocean conservation.
 Mike Mitchell, American podcaster, actor, comedian, and writer
 Michael J. Connor, retired United States Navy Vice Admiral and former Commander of the United States Submarine Forces
 Richard Wassersug, scientist, honorary professor in the Department of Cellular and Physiological Sciences at the University of British Columbia
 David Hemery, former track and field athlete, Olympian
 Leif Tilden, American actor, director, and writer
 Richard Prince, American painter and photographer
 Suzanne Ciani, American musician, sound designer, and composer
 Dick Mills former Major League Baseball pitcher for Boston Red Sox
 Ryan Ashton, American actor
 Jay O'Brien, ice hockey player
 Brian Gibbons, former NHL hockey player

Notable teachers
 Robert Vonnoh Famous American Impressionist

References

External links
 

1877 establishments in Massachusetts
Educational institutions established in 1877
Independent School League
Private high schools in Massachusetts
Private middle schools in Massachusetts
Private preparatory schools in Massachusetts
Education in Braintree, Massachusetts
Buildings and structures in Braintree, Massachusetts